Atli Heimir Sveinsson (21 September 1938 – 20 April 2019) was an Icelandic composer.

Atli Heimir was born in Reykjavík, Iceland and started piano lessons at the age of 10. He studied piano with Rögnvaldur Sigurjónsson at the Reykjavík College of Music and took his diploma in 1957. He went on to study at the State Academy in Cologne, Germany, from 1959, studying composition with Günter Raphael and Rudolf Petzold, instrumentation with Bernd Alois Zimmermann, conducting with Wolfgang von der Nahmer and piano with Hermann Pillney and Hans Otto Schmidt. He also took private lessons with Gottfried Michael Koenig. He took his diploma in composition and theory in 1963, a year in which he also attended summer courses in Darmstadt, making the acquaintance of Olivier Messiaen, Pierre Boulez, György Ligeti and Bruno Maderna. In 1964 he studied with Karlheinz Stockhausen, Henri Pousseur, Christoph Caskel and Frederic Rzewski. In 1965 he went to the Netherlands and studied electronic music with Gottfried Michael Koenig in Bilthoven.

He was president of the Icelandic Composers Association from 1972 to 1983. In 1976 he received the Nordic Council Music Prize for his Flute Concerto. Since 1992 Atli Heimir Sveinsson has received an honorary salary from the Icelandic Parliament. Atli Heimir was elected a member of the Royal Swedish Academy of Music in 1993. His Symphony Number Two premiered in Reykjavík on 1 June 2006.

Atli Heimir Sveinsson was married to Sif Sigurðardóttir, who died in 2018, and had two sons. On 21 April 2019, Iceland's national public broadcasting service RÚV reported Atli Heimir's death.
He was buried in Flatey, Breiðafjörður

Selected works
Atli Heimir has a varied list of works to his credit including operas, ballet and major orchestral works which are widely performed, including:

 nine solo concertos
 numerous orchestral, chamber and solo works
 an orchestral song cycle to Steinn Steinarr's poem Time and Water
 operas The Silk Drum, Vikivaki TV opera, Moonlight Island and Hertervig
 six symphonies
 Cathexis for viola and piano (1977–1978)
 Dúó Rapp for viola and double bass (2004)
 Könnun (Exploration) for viola and orchestra (1971)
 Minning II (Manuela in Memoriam) for bass flute, viola and harp (2006)
 Þrjú sönglög (3 Songs) for low voice, viola and piano (2000)
 Sonata for viola solo (2002)
 Sonata for viola and piano (2011)
 Springsongs I-IV and Minning (Manuela in Memoriam) for flute, viola and harp (2006)

A complete list of works is available at the composer's website.

References

External links
Atli Heimir Sveinsson's English Website (archive from 22 November 2014 available here).
Iceland Music Information Centre

1938 births
2019 deaths
Male classical composers
Atli Heimir Sveinsson
Atli Heimir Sveinsson
Male opera composers
Atli Heimir Sveinsson
Atli Heimir Sveinsson
Pupils of Karlheinz Stockhausen
20th-century classical composers
21st-century classical composers
Atli Heimir Sveinsson
20th-century male musicians
21st-century male musicians